Athletics competitions at the 1985 Bolivarian Games were held at the Estadio Alejandro Serrano Aguilar in Cuenca, Ecuador, between November 9–18, 1985.

A detailed history of the early editions of the Bolivarian Games between 1938
and 1989 was published in a book written (in Spanish) by José Gamarra
Zorrilla, former president of the Bolivian Olympic Committee, and first
president (1976-1982) of ODESUR.  Gold medal winners from Ecuador were published by the Comité Olímpico Ecuatoriano.

A total of 37 events were contested, 21 by men and 16 by women.

Medal summary

Medal winners were published.

Men

Women

Medal table (unofficial)

References

1985
1985 Bolivarian Games
Bolivarian Games